Ou Yushan (born January 13, 2004, in Guangxi, China) is a Chinese artistic gymnast. She is the 2019 Junior World all-around bronze medalist and team and floor exercise silver medalist. She represented China at the 2020 Summer Olympics.

Junior career

2018 
Ou debuted at the senior-level Chinese National Championships, helping the Guangdong team to the gold medals in the women's team and mixed team competitions.

2019 
Ou again represented Guangdong province at the Chinese National Championships. In the all-around, a fall on the uneven bars sunk her chances for the all-around gold, pushing her down to fourth place at that point, but after performing well on the balance beam she finished with a bronze medal. She also won three more individual medals: gold on the balance beam, silver on the floor exercise behind Shang Chunsong and bronze on the uneven bars behind Liu Tingting and Cheng Shiyi. Additionally, Ou and Liu led the Guandong province to win another gold in the provincial team final.

In June, Ou was selected to represent China at the inaugural Junior World Championships alongside Wei Xiaoyuan and Guan Chenchen.  While there, she helped China finish second in the team final, behind Russia and ahead of the United States.  Individually, Ou finished third in the all-around behind Russians Viktoria Listunova and Vladislava Urazova and won silver on floor exercise once again behind Listunova. She also placed fifth on uneven bars and eighth on balance beam after a fall.

She concluded her season with a strong performance at the second Chinese National Youth Games. She won three gold medals: team, balance beam, and floor exercise. She also won silver in the all-around and on uneven bars, both behind Wei Xiaoyuan, and won bronze on the vault behind Guan Chenchen and Zhang Silei.

Senior career

2020 
After the postponement of the 2020 Summer Olympics due to the COVID-19 pandemic, Ou increased expectations for her senior debut by showing upgrades on all four events at an internal test in early September. She notably attempted a balance beam routine with a start value of 7.5, which was more than a point higher than the 6.4 start value of Simone Biles' winning routine at the 2019 World Championships. She also showed a new double-twisting Yurchenko vault and stuck a new Silivas (double-twisting double tuck) on floor to win the internal test ahead of reigning World all-around silver medalist Tang Xijing. However, a knee injury forced Ou to withdraw from the Chinese National Championships a few weeks later.

2021 
In July, Ou was selected to represent China at the 2020 Summer Olympics alongside Lu Yufei, Tang Xijing, and Zhang Jin. Due to an Achilles injury, she only competed on the vault, uneven bars, and balance beam during the qualification round where she helped the Chinese team finish third. She did not qualify for any individual finals. In the team final, Ou fell on her double-twisting Yurchenko vault and the Chinese team finished seventh.

2022 
At the Chinese National Championships Ou placed second in the all-around behind Tang Xijing.  Additionally she placed third on balance beam and fifth on floor exercise.

Competitive history

References

External links 

 

Chinese female artistic gymnasts
2004 births
Living people
Gymnasts from Guangxi
Gymnasts from Guangdong
Medalists at the Junior World Artistic Gymnastics Championships
Gymnasts at the 2020 Summer Olympics
Olympic gymnasts of China
21st-century Chinese women